Noah William Isenberg (born June 28, 1967) is currently the George Christian Centennial Professor and Chair of the Department of Radio-Television-Film at The University of Texas at Austin.  He formerly served as Professor of Culture and Media at Eugene Lang College, where he was also the founding director of the Screen Studies program. Isenberg received his BA in History from the University of Pennsylvania, his MA in German Literature from the University of Washington and his PhD in German Studies from the University of California at Berkeley.

Career
Isenberg's works include We'll Always Have Casablanca: The Life, Legend, and Afterlife of Hollywood's Most Beloved Movie,Edgar G. Ulmer: A Filmmaker at the Margins, Detour, and, as editor, Weimar Cinema: An Essential Guide to Classic Films of the Era.

His work on Casablanca was chosen as a Summer Book of 2017 in The Financial Times, and earned a spot on the bestseller list of the Los Angeles Times. 

He is a fellow at the New York Institute for the Humanities, and was the recipient of an inaugural National Endowment for the Humanities Public Scholar Award in 2015-16.

Select bibliography

Books (selected)

"We'll Always Have ‘Casablanca’: The Life, Legend, and Afterlife of Hollywood's Most Beloved Movie" (New York: W.W. Norton; London: Faber & Faber; Budapest: Európa, 2017)
"Edgar G. Ulmer: A Filmmaker at the Margins " (Berkeley, CA: University of California Press, 2014)
"Editor, Weimar Cinema: An Essential Guide to Classic Films of the Era" (New York: Columbia University Press, 2009)
"Detour" (London: British Film Institute, 2008)
"Editor and translator, with a critical introduction, The Face of East European Jewry by Arnold Zweig" (Berkeley, CA: University of California Press, 2004) 
"Between Redemption and Doom: The Strains of German-Jewish Modernism" (Lincoln, NE: University of Nebraska Press, 1999; paperback edition 2008).

Articles (selected)

"Making the Movies Un-American" (The New Republic, 2018)
"Voluptuous Panic" (The New York Review of Books, 2018) 
"Hollywood’s Biggest Stars Seen Inside and Out" (The New York Times, 2017)
"The Poet of Ill Tidings" (The Nation, 2017) 
"Casablanca's Refugee Tale is shockingly Relevant for 2017" (The Daily Beast, 2017) 
"The Reluctant Enthusiast: Orson Welles on Casablanca" (The Paris Review, 2017)
"The Making of Steven Spielberg (review essay on Molly Haskell, Steven Spielberg: A Life in Films)"(New Republic, 2017) 
"Eavesdropping on Weimar" (The New York Review of Books, 2016)
"Maniacal Quests (review essay on Werner Herzog, Of Walking on Ice)" (The Nation, 2016)
"Made in Hollywood: Budd Schulberg’s Centennial" (The Paris Review Daily, 2014)
"Grand Collusion (Rev. of Ben Urwand, The Collaboration: Hollywood’s Pact with Hitler)," ( Bookforum, 2014)
"Other Worlds: Edgar G. Ulmer’s Underground Films of the 1950s" (Los Angeles Review of Books, 2013)
"A Last Gasp of Stale Air: Edgar G. Ulmer’s late noir Murder Is My Beat" (Moving Image Source, 2013.)
"Play It Again, Sam’—and Again and Again" (Wall Street Journal, 2012.)
""Illuminations" (Rev. of Miriam Hansen, Cinema and Experience: Siegfried Kracauer, Walter Benjamin, Theodor W. Adorno" ( Bookforum, 2012)

References 

American film historians
University of Washington alumni
University of California, Berkeley alumni
1967 births
Living people